Cole Harbour-Dartmouth is a provincial electoral district in Nova Scotia, Canada, that elects one member of the Nova Scotia House of Assembly.

This riding was created in 2019, following the recommendations of the 2018 Electoral Boundaries Commission. This riding was first contested in the 2021 election.

Geography 

Members of the Legislative Assembly 
This riding has elected the following MLAs:

Election results

2021

2017 redistributed results

References

External links 

Nova Scotia provincial electoral districts